Léon Dolmans (born 6 April 1945 in Uikhoven) is a retired Belgian footballer.

During his career he played for R. Standard de Liège. He earned 10 caps for the Belgium national football team, and participated in UEFA Euro 1972.

Honours

Player 
Standard Liège

 Belgian First Division: 1970–71
 Belgian League Cup: 1975
 Jules Pappaert Cup: 1971

International

Belgium 

 UEFA European Championship: 1972 (Third place)

References
Royal Belgian Football Association: Number of caps

1945 births
Living people
Belgian footballers
Belgium international footballers
UEFA Euro 1972 players
K. Waterschei S.V. Thor Genk players
Standard Liège players
Belgian Pro League players
People from Maasmechelen
Association football defenders
Footballers from Limburg (Belgium)